Fujigaoka Station (藤が丘駅) is the name of two train stations in Japan:

 Fujigaoka Station (Nagoya) in Nagoya, Aichi Prefecture.
 Fujigaoka Station (Kanagawa)